Richard Eleftherios Boyatzis (born October 1, 1946) is a Greek American organizational theorist and Distinguished University Professor in the Departments of Organizational Behavior, Psychology, and Cognitive Science at Case Western Reserve University, Adjunct Professor in People/Organizations at ESADE, as well as HR Horvitz Professor of Family Business. He is considered an expert in the field of emotional intelligence, behavior change, and competence.

Biography 
Professor Boyatzis acquired his bachelor's degree in aeronautics and astronautics from MIT before going on to obtain his MS and PhD in social psychology from Harvard University, and is a Board Certified Coach. He was awarded an Honorary Doctorate from ESADE Ramon Llull University in 2017.
Prior to becoming a professor in 1987, he had been President and CEO of McBer and Company (a research oriented human resource consulting company, now part of the Hay Group/Korn Ferry) for 11 years and COO of the market research company Yankelovich, Skelly & White for 3 years. During these years he worked on various projects from treatment of alcoholics and drug addicts to the development of competency based human resource systems and competency assessment validation. Prior to that he had been a psychologist for the Veterans Administration.

Work 
Boyatzis' major contributions to the competence human resource theory started with his pioneering study The Competent Manager (1982). He is the author of more than 200 scholarly articles and 75 practitioner articles on coaching, leadership, competencies, emotional intelligence, neuroscience and management education. His Coursera MOOCs on leadership, emotional intelligence and coaching have over one and a half million visitors and enrolments from 215 countries. 
Using his Intentional Change Theory, Richard studies sustained, desired change at all levels of human endeavor. He began research on helping and coaching in 1967 and coaching executives in 1969. Thirty years ago, he launched a series of longitudinal studies on coaching, followed by three fMRI and two hormonal studies of coaching processes that are effective in helping people be open to change. Using his work from 1970 as one of the founders of the competency movement in HR, he has launched several landmark studies on the competencies of coaches that predict client change.
Boyatzis is a frequent speaker on the international circuit, having delivered speeches and seminars on all seven continents and 65 countries. He has consulted to many Fortune 500 companies, government agencies and organizations in the Americas, Europe and Asia on various topics including executive and management development, organization structure, culture change, R&D productivity, economic development, selection, promotion, performance appraisal and career planning.
Professor Boyatzis is a Member, Consortium on Research on Emotional Intelligence; Member of editorial board, Journal of Management Education; Founding member, Academy of Management Learning and Education; Fellow of the Association of Psychological Science, the Society of Industrial and Organizational Psychology, and the American Psychological Association.

His 9 books include: The Competent Manager (in 2 languages); the international best-seller, Primal Leadership with Daniel Goleman and Annie McKee (in 28 languages); Becoming a Resonant Leader, with Annie McKee and Francis Johnston (in 8 languages), and Transforming Qualitative Information (in 2 languages), Helping People Change: Coaching with Compassion for Lifelong Learning and Growth  with Melvin Smith and Ellen Van Oosten ( named on Teambuilding.com list one of the “11 Best Coaching Books to Read for Work in 2022.”).

Awards, honors:
 Top 50 Global Thinkers in Coaching, Top 50 Thinkers. (2021).
 Lifetime Achievement Award for Contributions to Leadership Coaching, Coaching at Work. (2020).
 Fellow, American Psychological Association. (2020).
 №1 Coach Academic Influencer , Thinkers 50, Top 50 Coaches Worldwide. (2019).
 Fellow, Society for Industrial and Organizational Psychology. (2019).
 Vision of Excellence Award for the Science of Coaching, Institute of Coaching. (2018).
 Distinctive Contribution to the field of Project Management, International Society for Project Management. (2017).
 Archer Lifetime Achievement Award, Crains Business Cleveland. (2017).
 Fellow, Association of Psychological Science. (2016).
 Most Influential International Thinker, HR Magazine. (2014).
 №9 Most Influential International Thinker by HR Magazine in 2012 and 2014;
 Named on the 2021 World's Top 2% Scientists list, which includes the most-cited scientists across the length of their career (the ranking is compiled by Stanford University, based on data from Elsevier’s Scopus, and published in PLOS Biology Journal;the selection is built from a database of over 100,000 top-scientists that provides standardized information on citations).

Selected publications 
Boyatzis has published 200 books and articles in the areas of emotional intelligence, behavior change, competencies and leadership:
 Competent manager: a model for effective performance (1982)
 Innovation in professional education - steps on a journey from teaching to learning: the story of change and invention at the Weatherhead School of Management (1995)
 Transforming qualitative information: thematic analysis and code development (1998)
 Primal leadership: realizing the power of emotional intelligence - with Daniel Goleman and Annie McKee (2002)
 Resonant Leadership: renewing yourself and connecting with others through mindfulness, hope, and compassion (2005)
 Becoming a resonant leader: develop your emotional intelligence, renew your relationships, sustain your effectiveness - with Annie McKee and Frances Johnston (2008)
 Primal Leadership, With a New Preface by the Authors: Unleashing the Power of Emotional Intelligence (2013)
 Helping People Change: Coaching with Compassion for Lifelong Learning and Growth (2019)

References

External links 

 Faculty page
What Distinguishes Great Leaders
The Power and Importance of Positive Visioning

1946 births
Living people
American business theorists
Case Western Reserve University faculty
Harvard Graduate School of Arts and Sciences alumni
Scientists from New York City
MIT School of Engineering alumni